Peter Henry may refer to:

 Peter Henry (captive) (1764–1858), American captive of Native Americans
 Peter Henry (bobsledder) (born 1962), New Zealand bobsledder and decathlete
 Peter Henry (footballer) (fl. 1983–1985), New Zealand footballer
 Peter Blair Henry (born 1969), Jamaican-born American economist

See also
 Pete Henry (1897–1952), American football player and coach